Cyclin-T2 is a protein that in humans is encoded by the CCNT2 gene.

Function 

The protein encoded by this gene belongs to the highly conserved cyclin family, whose members are characterized by a dramatic periodicity in protein abundance through the cell cycle. Cyclins function as regulators of CDK kinases. Different cyclins exhibit distinct expression and degradation patterns which contribute to the temporal coordination of each mitotic event. This cyclin and its kinase partner CDK9 were found to be subunits of the transcription elongation factor p-TEFb. The p-TEFb complex containing this cyclin was reported to interact with, and act as a negative regulator of human immunodeficiency virus type 1 (HIV-1) Tat protein. Two alternatively spliced transcript variants, which encode distinct isoforms, have been described.

Interactions 

Cyclin T2 has been shown to interact with CDK9 and Retinoblastoma protein.

References

Further reading

External links 
 

Cell cycle regulators